Stone Hall is a historic home located at Cockeysville, Baltimore County, Maryland, United States.  It is a manor house set on a  estate that was originally part of a  tract called Nicholson's Manor.  It was patented by William Nicholson of Kent County, Maryland in 1719. The property in what is now known as the Worthington Valley was split up in 1754 and sold in 1050-acre lots to Roger Boyce, Corbin Lee, Brian Philpot, and Thinsey Johns.

The house known as Stone Hall was built on the 360-acre plantation bought by Thomas Gent, in 1775 from Philpot. Gent served as a colonel in the Baltimore Militia during the Revolutionary War.

The house was built in four section beginning in the late eighteenth century: the initial stage consisted of a -story fieldstone structure built before 1783; the north and south wings were added between 1783 and 1798; and the -story, gable-roofed, fieldstone main block at the north end. During the later years as a working plantation in the antebellum period, the -story structure was likely used as a separate kitchen. Other outbuildings would have included slave quarters. Many of these were likely kept after emancipation to be used by sharecroppers.

The last section of the mansion, a -story fieldstone addition, was built about 1930, probably after the property was bought by Garnet and Salina Hulings.  Also on the property is a barn, carriage house, and a blacksmith shop.

The house was listed on the National Register of Historic Places in 1973.

References

External links
, including undated photo, at Maryland Historical Trust

African-American history of Baltimore County, Maryland
Cockeysville, Maryland
Houses in Baltimore County, Maryland
Houses on the National Register of Historic Places in Maryland
Houses completed in 1783
Federal architecture in Maryland
National Register of Historic Places in Baltimore County, Maryland
Blacksmith shops
Plantation houses in Maryland